Deal or No Deal is a video game based upon the television show Deal or No Deal. It was released for Microsoft Windows, Game Boy Advance, Nintendo DS, Wii, iOS, and BlackBerry, and is available as a DVD TV game. There are two different versions available, one is the North American version and the other is the United Kingdom version.

Reception

The Wii version of Deal or No Deal received "mixed" reviews, while the PC and DS versions received "generally unfavorable reviews", according to the review aggregation website Metacritic.

IGN criticized the Wii version's character design, calling it "freaktacular".  The same website also highly criticized the DS version for its dodgy graphics and called it "broken" (due to the fact that whenever the system is shut down, the money goes back into the same case from the previous game the next time the game is played). GameSpot called the same DS version the most idiot-proof concept in the world.

References

External links

2006 video games
BlackBerry games
DVD interactive technology
Game Boy Advance games
Nintendo DS games
Wii games
Windows games
Video games based on game shows
Destination Software games
Video games scored by Allister Brimble
Video games scored by Frédéric Motte
Video games developed in Australia
Video games developed in the United Kingdom
Video games developed in the United States
Mindscape games
Deal or No Deal
Global Star Software games
Cat Daddy Games games
Black Lantern Studios games